Roemeria argemone (syn. Papaver argemone) is a species of flowering plant in the poppy family Papaveraceae. Its common names include long pricklyhead poppy, prickly poppy and pale poppy. Its native range includes parts of Eurasia and North Africa, but it can be found growing wild in parts of North America, where it is an introduced species. It is cultivated as an ornamental plant.

Description
The fern-like green, leaves at the base of the plant have stalks, but upper leaves are stalk-less. The flowers have four slightly overlapping red petals, each with a dark base. Later, the plant produces a seed capsule, oblong to clavate (shaped like a club) with ribs and up to 2 cm long.

Biochemistry
The plant contains alkaloids and has been used in herbal medicines. It also means the plant is not eaten much by grazing animals.

Taxonomy

It is commonly known as 'prickly poppy', 'pale poppy', and 'long pricklyhead poppy'. It is known as 'Sand-Mohn' in German, 'spikvallmo' in Swedish, and 'amapola macho' in Spanish.

The Latin specific epithet argemone is derived from the Greek 'argema' meaning cataract, and was applied by Dioscorides to a poppy-like plant used to treat cataracts. See Argemone (a genus of flowering plants in the family Papaveraceae commonly known as 'prickly poppies').

It was formerly described by the Swedish botanist Carl Linnaeus in his seminal publication Species Plantarum in 1753 on page 506.

Distribution and habitat
It is native to temperate regions of North Africa, Europe and Western Asia. including Macaronesia, Canary Islands, Algeria, Egypt and Morocco. Within Western Asia it is found in the Caucasus, Armenia, Cyprus, Egypt (in the Sinai), Iran, Iraq, Israel, Jordan, Lebanon, Syria and Turkey. In eastern Europe, it is found within Belarus, Estonia, Latvia, Lithuania, Moldova and Ukraine. In middle Europe, it is in Austria, Belgium, Germany, Hungary, Netherlands, Poland, Slovakia and Switzerland. In northern Europe, in Denmark, Ireland, Sweden and United Kingdom. In southeastern Europe, within Albania, Bosnia and Herzegovina, Croatia, Greece, Italy, Montenegro, North Macedonia, Romania, Serbia and Slovenia. In southwestern Europe, it is found in France, Portugal and Spain.

It has been introduced into the American states of Idaho, Oregon, Pennsylvania and Utah.

Habitat

It grows in fields and disturbed soils (including ploughed).

Uses
In the past, the pale poppy was used in herbal medicines.

Culture
The petal of the poppy, was once used in folklore, as a test of faithfulness. A petal was placed in the palm of the loved ones hand and if when stuck with a fist and produced a snapping sound, the loved one was true.

References

Other sources
 Aldén, B., S. Ryman, & M. Hjertson Svensk Kulturväxtdatabas, SKUD (Swedish Cultivated and Utility Plants Database 2012 (Kulturvaxtdatabas)
 CIBA-GEIGY, Basel, Switzerland The CIBA-GEIGY Weed Tables. 1974 (Weed TabCIBA)
 Davis, P. H., ed. Flora of Turkey and the east Aegean islands. 1965-1988 (F Turk)
 Erhardt, W. et al. Zander: Handwörterbuch der Pflanzennamen, 16. Auflage. 2000 (Zander ed16)
 FNA Editorial Committee Flora of North America. 1993- (F NAmer)
 Greuter, W. et al., eds. Med-Checklist. 1984- (L Medit)
 Grey-Wilson, C. Poppies: The poppy family in the wild and in cultivation. 1993 (Poppies) 137.
 Izquierdo Z., I. et al., eds. Lista de especies silvestres de Canarias: hongos, plantas y animales terrestres. 2004 (L Canarias)
 Jalas, J. & J. Suominen Atlas florae europaeae. 1972- (Atlas Eur)
 Kadereit, J. W. 1986. "A revision of Papaver sect. Argemonidium Notes", Royal Botanical Garden Edinburgh 44:35.
 Kartesz, J. T. "A synonymized checklist of the vascular flora of the United States, Canada, and Greenland". 1994 (L US Can ed2)
 Komarov, V. L. et al., eds. Flora SSSR. 1934-1964 (F USSR)
 Lazarides, M. & B. Hince CSIRO Handbook of Economic Plants of Australia. 1993 (Econ Pl Aust)
 Mouterde, P. Nouvelle flore du Liban et de la Syrie. 1966- (F Liban)
 Rechinger, K. H., ed. Flora iranica. 1963- (F Iran)
 Tutin, T. G. et al., eds. Flora europaea, second edition. 1993 (F Eur ed2)
 Zohary, M. & N. Feinbrun-Dothan Flora palaestina. 1966- (F Palest)

External links
Jepson Manual Treatment
Photo gallery

Papaveroideae
Flora of Europe
Flora of North Africa
Flora of Macaronesia
Flora of the Caucasus
Flora of Cyprus
Flora of Iran
Flora of Iraq
Flora of Palestine (region)
Flora of Lebanon and Syria
Flora of Turkey
Plants described in 1753
Taxa named by Carl Linnaeus